Amy Belle (born 1981) is a Scottish singer. She is best known for her duet with Rod Stewart on "I Don't Want To Talk About It" during his concert at the Albert Hall in October 2004.
The official Rod Stewart video of the performance has received over 755 million Youtube views (as of 13th March 2023). In addition, another Youtube posting of this event has received over 100 million views.

Biography 
Belle was born and raised in Glasgow, Scotland, the youngest sibling of three. She started out busking covers of R.E.M. and Alanis Morissette.

At 17 she left Glasgow and moved in London to pursue a career in music. In 2001, she was signed to a short-lived manufactured pop-folk group called the Alice Band. In 2004, Belle was spotted by a friend of Stewart's when she was busking outside an underground station.

After the duet with Stewart, Belle moved to Los Angeles through contacts she made via Stewart's manager. There she recorded a track with Robby Krieger and Ray Manzarek from The Doors, and wrote two songs for Miley Cyrus, "Talk Is Cheap" and "Giving You Up".

Personal life
She is married to an English solicitor.

References

21st-century Scottish singers
Musicians from Glasgow
21st-century Scottish women singers
Living people
1981 births